Graziano is both a masculine Italian given name and a surname. Notable people with the name include:

Given name
 Graziano Battistini (1936–1994), Italian professional road bicycle racer
 Graziano Battistini (footballer) (born 1970), Italian football goalkeeper
 Graziano Boscacci (born 1969), Italian ski mountaineer
 Graziano Calvaresi (born 1966), Italian former long-distance runner
 Graziano Cecchini (born 1953), Italian artist and activist, known for his works of "vandalism" art
 Graziano Cioni (born 1946), Italian politician 
 Graziano Delrio (born 1960), Italian mayor and politician
 Graziano Di Prima (born 1994), Sicilian/Italian dancer
 Graziano Gasparini (1924–2019), Venezuelan architect and architectural historian
 Graziano Gasparre (born 1978), Italian former cyclist
 Graziano Girardi (born 1940), Italian politician
 Graziano Mancinelli (1937–1992), Italian show jumping rider
 Graziano Origa (20th century), Italian comics artist
 Graziano Pellè (born 1985), Italian football (soccer) striker
 Graziano Rossi (born 1954), Italian former Grand Prix motorcycle road racer
 Graziano Salvietti (born 1956), Italian former professional racing cyclist
 Graziano Santucci, O.S.A. (died 1517), Italian Roman Catholic bishop of Alatri

Fictional
Graziano, kinsman to Brabantio in Shakespeare's Othello

Surname
 Guido di Graziano (also known as Guido of Siena), Italian painter in a Byzantine style, active during the 13th-century in Siena
 Mino di Graziano (1289–1323), Italian painter, active in Siena

 Anthony Graziano (1940–2019), Italian-American mobster
 Bob Graziano (21st century), American baseball executive
 Claudio Graziano (born 1953), Italian Army officer who serves as Chairman of the European Union Military Committee
 David Graziano (born 1972), American screenwriter and producer
 Giovanni Graziano (born 1995), Italian professional footballer 
 Ilaria Graziano (21st century), Italian singer and vocalist
 José Graziano da Silva (born 1949), American-born Brazilian agronomist and Director General of the FAO
 Leonardo Graziano (born 1975), Italian voice actor
 Manlio Graziano, Italian scholar specializing in geopolitics and geopolitics of religions
 Renee Graziano (born 1968), American reality television personality and author
 Ricardo Graziano (born 1986), Brazilian ballet dancer and choreographer
 Rocky Graziano (1919–1990), American boxer
 Sal E. Graziano (21st century), Italian professional wrestler
 Michael Graziano (born 1967), American scientist and novelist, professor of psychology and neuroscience at Princeton University

See also
 Graziano Trasmissioni, an Italian company, manufacturer of gearboxes, drivelines and its components

Italian masculine given names
Italian-language surnames